Elections to Limavady Borough Council were held on 5 May 2011 on the same day as the other Northern Irish local government elections. The election used three district electoral areas to elect a total of 15 councillors.

Election results

Note: "Votes" are the first preference votes.

Districts summary

|- class="unsortable" align="centre"
!rowspan=2 align="left"|Ward
! % 
!Cllrs
! % 
!Cllrs
! %
!Cllrs
! %
!Cllrs
! % 
!Cllrs
! % 
!Cllrs
!rowspan=2|TotalCllrs
|- class="unsortable" align="center"
!colspan=2 bgcolor="" | Sinn Féin
!colspan=2 bgcolor="" | DUP
!colspan=2 bgcolor="" | SDLP
!colspan=2 bgcolor="" | UUP
!colspan=2 bgcolor="" | TUV
!colspan=2 bgcolor="white"| Others
|-
|align="left"|Bellarena
|bgcolor="#008800"|34.1
|bgcolor="#008800"|2
|29.2
|1
|18.1
|1
|12.1
|1
|0.0
|0
|6.5
|0
|5
|-
|align="left"|Benbradagh
|bgcolor="#008800"|56.4
|bgcolor="#008800"|3
|12.8
|0
|13.0
|1
|0.0
|0
|15.4
|1
|2.4
|1
|5
|-
|align="left"|Limavady Town
|18.1
|1
|bgcolor="#D46A4C"|40.7
|bgcolor="#D46A4C"|2
|11.2
|1
|19.3
|1
|0.0
|0
|10.7
|0
|5
|-
|- class="unsortable" class="sortbottom" style="background:#C9C9C9"
|align="left"| Total
|38.0
|6
|26.2
|3
|14.5
|3
|9.6
|2
|5.5
|1
|6.2
|0
|15
|-
|}

District results

Bellarena

2005: 2 x Sinn Féin, 1 x DUP, 1 x SDLP, 1 x UUP
2011: 2 x Sinn Féin, 1 x DUP, 1 x SDLP, 1 x UUP
2005-2011 Change: No change

Benbradagh

2005: 3 x Sinn Féin, 1 x United Unionist, 1 x SDLP
2011: 3 x Sinn Féin, 1 x TUV, 1 x SDLP
2005-2011 Change: United Unionist joins TUV

Limavady Town

2005: 2 x DUP, 1 x UUP, 1 x Sinn Féin, 1 x SDLP
2011: 2 x DUP, 1 x UUP, 1 x Sinn Féin, 1 x SDLP
2005-2011 Change: No change

References

Limavady Borough Council elections
Limavady